The rock greenling (Hexagrammos lagocephalus) is a species of marine ray-finned fish belonging to the family Hexagrammidae, the greenlings. It is sometimes known as fringed greenling and erroneously as the red rock trout.

Taxonomy
The rock greenling was first formally described in 1810 as Labrax lagocephalus by the German naturalist Peter Simon Pallas with its type locality given as the Kuril Islands. The specific name, lagocephalus, means "harehead", an name not explained by Pallas but may refer to the rounded, rabbit like snout.

Appearance
The fish is maroon, with blue spot that fades to bright red. The color pattern helps it blend in with its natural environment. It grows to up to 24 in (60 cm) long. Most adult have blue mouths, while the young have bright red eyes.

Behavior
The species is usually solitary, but not aggressive, which has led to easy husbandry in public aquaria. It is sometimes cryptic, however, and often elusive to divers and spear fishermen, as they prefer living among the rock in the heavy surge.

Diet
Hexagrammos lagocephalus is a generalized feeder, eating everything from invertebrates such as crabs and isopods to fish eggs and algae. When young, the fish eat zooplankton.

Range
The rock greenling's natural distribution is along the Pacific Coast the Kuril Islands and the Bering Sea to the coast of southern California. Its habitat of choice is rocky shoreline. Sometimes, though, they can be found in tidepools and sandy areas.

Economic value
Though not commonly commercially fished like the related lingcod, they are a popular gamefish. Most live among areas impossible to fish by commercial boats. They are commonly caught by sport fishers off exposed rocky shores.

References

External links
Hexagrammos lagocephalus at Fishbase

Hexagrammos
Fish of the Pacific Ocean
Western North American coastal fauna
Fish described in 1810
Taxa named by Peter Simon Pallas